Luca Cordero di Montezemolo (born 31 August 1947) is an Italian businessman, former Chairman of Ferrari, and formerly Chairman of Fiat S.p.A. and President of Confindustria and FIEG. He comes from an aristocratic family from the region of Piedmont in Italy. He graduated with a degree in law from La Sapienza University in 1971. Afterward, he studied for a master's degree in international commercial law at Columbia University. He is one of the founders and former president of NTV, an Italian company which is Europe's first private open access operator of 300 km/h (186 mph) high-speed trains.

In 2009, Montezemolo founded Future Italy, a free market think tank that joined Civic Choice in the 2013 Italian parliamentary election.

Biography

Ancestry and family background
Born in Bologna, Italy, he is the youngest son of Massimo Cordero dei Marchesi di Montezemolo (1920–2009), a Piedmontese aristocrat whose family served the Royal House of Savoy for generations, and Clotilde Neri (1922–2017), niece of famed Italian surgeon Vincenzo Neri. His uncle, Admiral Giorgio Cordero dei Marchesi di Montezemolo (1918–1986) was a commander in the Regia Marina in World War II. His grandfather, Mario (1888–1960) and great-grandfather Carlo (1858–1943) were both Generals in the Italian Army.  He is also a relation to Andrea Cordero Lanza di Montezemolo (his father Massimo and Andrea were cousins), who became a cardinal in 2006 and whose father, colonel Giuseppe Cordero di Montezemolo, was killed by the Nazi occupation troops during the massacre of the Fosse Ardeatine in Rome in 1944. His surname is actually "Cordero di Montezemolo" and the correct usage is either the full surname or just Montezemolo (omitting the "di"); Marchesi is a noble title.

Career

Montezemolo's sporting career began at the wheel of a Giannini Fiat 500 which he raced together with his friend Cristiano Rattazzi. Later, Montezemolo briefly drove for the privately owned Lancia rally team known as HF Squadra Corse. He joined the auto manufacturing conglomerate FIAT S.p.A., headquartered in Torino, Italy, and in 1973 was moved to Ferrari, where he became Enzo Ferrari's assistant and, in 1974, manager of the Scuderia. During his involvement with the team, Ferrari won the Formula One World Championship with Niki Lauda in 1975 and 1977. In 1976 Montezemolo was promoted to become head of all FIAT racing activities, and in 1977 he advanced to become a senior manager of FIAT.

Throughout the 1980s, Montezemolo occupied a number of positions in the FIAT empire, including managing director of the drinks company Cinzano and director of the publishing company Itedi. In 1982, he managed America's Cup challenge of Team Azzurra, the first Italian yacht club to enter the event. In 1985, he became manager of the Organizing Committee for 1990 World Cup Italia.

In November 1991, FIAT Chairman Gianni Agnelli appointed Montezemolo president of Ferrari, which had been struggling since Enzo Ferrari's death. Montezemolo made it his personal goal to win the Formula One World Constructors' Championship once again. Montezemolo quickly made changes at the Italian team, signing up Niki Lauda as consultant and promoting Claudio Lombardi to team manager role. During the 1990s he resurrected the Ferrari road car business from heavy debts into solid profit. He also took on the presidency of Maserati when Ferrari acquired it in 1997, until 2005.

Under Montezemolo and executive director Jean Todt, the Ferrari Formula One team won the World Drivers' Championship in 2000, the first time since 1979. The previous year, 1999, they had won the Constructors' Championship for the first time since 1983.

On 27 May 2004, Montezemolo became president of Italian business lobby Confindustria. Days later, following the death of Umberto Agnelli on 28 May, he was elected chairman of Fiat S.p.A., Ferrari's parent company. Since 20 December 2004, he has also been president of the LUISS, the Free International University for Social Studies Guido Carli in Rome.

Montezemolo has often been reported to have aspirations of a career in Italian politics, most recently the office of Prime Minister, but has always denied the rumours.

On 29 July 2008, Montezemolo founded the Formula One Teams Association (FOTA) which he presided over from 2008 to 2010, eventually being replaced by McLaren CEO Martin Whitmarsh. The Committee used to meet on a regular basis to discuss improvements to Formula One. FOTA was formally dissolved in 2014.

In April 2010, John Elkann replaced Montezemolo as Chairman of Fiat S.p.A.

On 10 September 2014, Montezemolo resigned as president and chairman of Ferrari following increasing tension with his would-be successor, FIAT Chrysler CEO, Sergio Marchionne.

On 26 November 2014, Montezemolo was appointed non-executive chairman of the Board of Directors of Italian flag carrier Alitalia. In February 2015 he became committee president of the Rome bid for the 2024 Summer Olympics.

In July 2015, he was inducted into the Automotive Hall of Fame.

He received the America Award of the Italy-USA Foundation in 2017.

Personal life 
In 2012 Montezemolo was issued a suspended sentence of one year imprisonment by the court in Naples for the unauthorized construction of his personal residence in Anacapri, Italy.

Awards

References

External links 

Luca de Montezemolo – Ferrari Chairman interview

Italian business executives
Italian chairpersons of corporations
Italian industrialists
1947 births
Living people
Businesspeople from Bologna
People of Piedmontese descent
Ferrari people
Formula One team principals
Fiat people
Italian rally drivers
Italian racing drivers
International Motorsports Hall of Fame inductees
People named in the Panama Papers
Presidents of Confindustria
20th-century Italian businesspeople
21st-century Italian businesspeople
Italian motorsport people
Automotive businesspeople
Nobility from Bologna
Sportspeople from Bologna